Pseudobathylagus milleri, the stout blacksmelt, also called the owlfish due to its large eyes relative to its body, is a species of deep-sea smelt native to the north Pacific Ocean where it is found to depths of .

References

External links
 Video of a squid subduing and killing an owlfish from the Monterey Bay Aquarium Research Institute.

Bathylagidae
Fish described in 1898
Monotypic fish genera